The 2019 Montreux Volley Masters was the 34rd edition of the women's volleyball competition set in Montreux, Switzerland.

Participating teams
Teams:

Squads

Group stage
The first 2 teams of each group qualify for the final round.
All times are Central European Summer Time (UTC+02:00).

Group A

|}

|}

Group B

|}

|}

Classification round

|}

Final round

Semifinal 

|}

3rd place

|}

Final

|}

Final standings

Awards

Most Valuable Player

Best Setter

Best Outside Spikers

Best Middle Blockers

Best Opposite Spiker

Best Libero

References

2019
Montreux Volley Masters
Montreux Volley Masters
Montreux Volley Masters